Oud Ade (also: Oud-Ade) is a village in the Dutch province of South Holland. It is a part of the municipality of Kaag en Braassem, and lies about 7 km east of Leiden.

The village was first mentioned in 1395 or 1396 "Ecclesia de A". The current name means "the old river". Oud Ade developed as a peat excavation settlement, but remained a small linear settlement. It developed into the village in the 1960s by the addition of planned neighbourhoods. The Catholic St Bavo Church was built in 1868.

Gallery

References

Populated places in South Holland
Kaag en Braassem